In mathematics, a Weierstrass ring, named by Nagata after Karl Weierstrass, is a commutative local ring that is Henselian, pseudo-geometric, and such that  any quotient ring by a prime ideal is a finite extension of a regular local ring.

Examples
The Weierstrass preparation theorem can be used to show that the ring of convergent power series over the complex numbers in a finite number of variables is a Wierestrass ring. The same is true if the complex numbers are replaced by a perfect field with a valuation. 
Every ring that is a finitely-generated module over a Weierstrass ring is also a Weierstrass ring.

References

Bibliography

 

Commutative algebra